Leonard Sowders  (June 29, 1861 – November 21, 1888), was a Major League Baseball player who played outfielder. He played for the  Baltimore Orioles of the American Association during the 1886 season. His brothers Bill and John also played professional baseball.

See also
 List of baseball players who died during their careers

External links

1861 births
1888 deaths
Major League Baseball outfielders
Baltimore Orioles (AA) players
19th-century baseball players
Fort Wayne Hoosiers players
Nashville Americans players
Jersey City Skeeters players
London Tecumsehs (baseball) players
Omaha Omahogs players
Omaha Lambs players
Burials at Crown Hill Cemetery
Baseball players from Louisville, Kentucky